Hungry Horse Dam is an arch dam in the western United States, on the South Fork Flathead River in the Rocky Mountains of northwest Montana. The Hungry Horse project, dam, and powerplant are operated by the U.S. Bureau of Reclamation. The entrance road leading to the dam is located in Hungry Horse.

The purposes of the Hungry Horse Project authorized by law are irrigation, flood control, navigation, streamflow regulation, hydroelectric generation, and other beneficial uses such as recreation. However, no irrigation facilities were built and the project has no irrigation obligations. Hydroelectric power generation and flood control are the primary purposes of the dam. The dam, reservoir, and surrounding area are used for recreation.

Dimensions and statistics

The dam's spillway is the highest morning glory structure in the world.

History

Construction was authorized by the Act of June 5, 1944 (58 Stat. 270, Public Law 78-329). In April 1948, Reclamation awarded the $43.4 million dam construction contract to Morrison-Knudsen, General Construction Company, and Shea Company. The Guy F. Atkinson Company won the contract to divert the river during dam construction. Two timber companies, Wixson and Crowe and J. H. Trisdale, cleared seven thousand acres to make way for the reservoir. Construction officially began with a weekend of ceremonies in June 1948. In September 1949, workers poured the first concrete. The project eventually used 3 million cubic yards of concrete. Engineers adopted air-entrained concrete to reduce the effect of freeze-thaw cycles and to make the material more stable and workable. They also incorporated fly ash into the concrete mix. Hungry Horse was the first dam built with these innovations. The construction claimed the lives of 23 men.

Construction was completed on July 18, 1953. At a ceremony on October 1, 1952, President Harry S. Truman threw a switch to start power generation. The road across the dam opened to the public on November 2, 1953.

Hydroelectric power generation
The project contributes to hydroelectric power generation not only at Hungry Horse Dam, but by storing and releasing water for use by downriver hydroelectric dams on the Flathead, Clark Fork, Pend Oreille, and Columbia rivers. About a billion kilowatt–hours are generated annually at Hungry Horse Dam, while in an average year the release water will generate about 4.6 billion kilowatt–hours of power as it passes through the series of downstream powerplants.

Power generating facilities at Hungry Horse Dam are housed in a building constructed across the river channel at the downstream toe of the dam. The original design included four 71,250-kilowatt generators—a total of 285 megawatts installed capacity. The generator capacity was uprated in the 1990s to 107,000 kilowatts each for a total capacity of 428 megawatts.

Nearby and downstream, an aluminum production plant was constructed in the mid-1950s, northeast of Columbia Falls.

Tributaries

The Hungry Horse Reservoir is fed by a number of smaller creeks and streams, including:

See also

 List of dams in the Columbia River watershed

References

External links

Historic American Engineering Record (HAER) documentation, filed under South Fork Flathead River, Hungry Horse, Flathead County, MT:

Dams in Montana
Buildings and structures in Flathead County, Montana
Historic American Engineering Record in Montana
Hydroelectric power plants in Montana
Reservoirs in Montana
Flathead National Forest
Protected areas of Flathead County, Montana
United States Bureau of Reclamation dams
Energy infrastructure completed in 1953
Dams completed in 1953
Dams on the Flathead River
Arch dams
Landforms of Flathead County, Montana
1953 establishments in Montana